Lieutenant-General Sir Charles Montagu KB (died 1 August 1777) was a British Army officer.

He was the son of Brigadier-General Edward Montagu, colonel of the 11th Foot and Governor of Hull, nephew of George Montagu, 1st Earl of Halifax, and great-nephew to the celebrated minister Charles Montagu, 1st Earl of Halifax. He had an elder brother, Edward, who was killed at the Battle of Fontenoy, being then lieutenant-colonel of the 31st Foot.

Montagu attained the rank of colonel in the Army on 30 November 1755, major-general on 25 June 1759, colonel of the 2nd (The Queen's Royal) Regiment of Foot on 27 November 1760, and lieutenant-general on 19 January 1761.

References

1777 deaths
Knights Companion of the Order of the Bath
British Army generals
Queen's Royal Regiment officers
Year of birth missing
59th Regiment of Foot officers
Charles